Coralee is a feminine given name. Notable people with the name include:

Coralee Oakes (born 1972), Canadian politician
Coralee O'Rourke, Australian politician
Coralee Elliott Testar (born 1946), Vancouver based producer and screenwriter

See also
Coralie

Feminine given names